TC3 may refer to:

 Tc3 transposon, a transposon in Caenorhabditis elegans
 2008 TC3, a meteoroid that entered Earth's atmosphere on October 7, 2008
 Tha Carter III, a studio album by American rapper Lil Wayne
 Tompkins Cortland Community College, also abbreviated as TC3, a college in Dryden, New York, United States
 Time Crisis 3, the third instalment of the Time Crisis arcade game series
 TC3 International Series, an international touring car series
 Tactical Combat Casualty Care, a standard of care in prehospital battlefield medicine
 Plymouth Horizon TC3, an automobile manufactured by Chrysler Corporation